Heavyweight EP is a 2012 EP by Rachael Yamagata.

Development 
The EP consists of leftovers from the creation of Chesapeake, which Yamagata worked on the previous year, plus some songs that were composed during touring Europe and North America. Yamagata returns to her previous formula of piano and strings. The song "Keep Going" was used in the 2012 film, To Write Love on Her Arms, also known as Renee. The tracks were recorded in The Village, The Bunny Ranch, Crab Trap, Marlay Studio, and Ice Station Zebra Studio in Medford, Massachusetts. The cover artwork is by Jan Zoya, whose artwork impressed Yamagata with its feeling of sadness, nostalgia, and passion.

Track listing

Personnel

Musicians 

Rachael Yamagata – Vocals, piano, acoustic guitar, Wurlitzer
John Alagía – Bass, keyboards, electric guitar
Michael Chaves – Guitar, electric guitar, dulcimer, organ
Oli Kraus – Violin, strings (written, arranged, performed)
Adam Popick – Drums, acoustic guitar, electric guitar
Tom Freund – Bass
Liz Phair – Electric guitar (track 2)
Mike Viola – Piano, Wurlitzer
Victor Indrizzo – Drums
Madi Diaz – Wurlizter
Paul Ahlstrand – Strings (arranged)
Michael Rosenbloom – Violin
Lisa Crockett – Violin
Sue Culpo – Viola
Ron Lowry – Cello

Production 

John Alagía – Producer, mixing, engineering
Mike Viola – Producer
Brad Blackwood – Mastering
Dan Piscina – Mixing, engineering
Ducky Carlisle – Mixing, engineering
Pete Hanlon – Engineering
Eric Robinson – Engineering
Michael Chaves – Engineering
Jan Zoya – Cover art

References 

2012 EPs
Rachael Yamagata albums